Gustavo Sánchez may refer to:
 Gustavo Sánchez (artistic swimmer) (born 2000), Colombian artistic swimmer
 Gustavo Sánchez Martínez (born 1994), Mexican Paralympic swimmer
 Gustavo Sánchez Parra (born 1966), Mexican actor